The large skipper (Ochlodes sylvanus) is a butterfly of the family Hesperiidae.

Taxonomy
It was long known as Ochlodes venatus, but this is a Far Eastern relative. There is still some dispute whether this species should be considered a distinct species or included in O. venatus as a subspecies. Under ICZN rules the specific name, originally proposed as Papilio sylvanus, is invalid as a homonym (of the butterfly now called Anthene sylvanus), but it has been conserved by an ICZN commission decision in 2000.

Distribution and habitat
This species occurs from Europe to the East Palearctic realm (northern Asia, China and Japan). In the British Isles it occurs in England, Wales, and south western Scotland. It can be found anywhere where wild grasses are allowed to grow tall. Hedgerows, woodland clearings and edges are favourites.

Description
Ochlodes sylvanus has a wingspan of 28–32 mm, which is similar in size to Chequered skipper. Although called "large" this is still a relatively small butterfly and not much larger than either the small or Essex skippers. The body is rather squat. The antennae are hooked at their tips. The upperside of the wings is orange-brown with a brown border and some lighter spots. The underside of the hindwings is greenish-yellow, marked with sparse yellow spots. The male has a broad scented androconial dark line across the top of the forewings. On the hindwings of the females there are brighter square marks. When the wings are opened, the forewings are obliquely folded, masking the hindwings.

The faint chequered pattern on both the upperside and underside, and also the hook-shaped antenna tips, help to distinguish the large skipper from these two orange skippers. The Lulworth skipper also has patterned wings, but does not have the hooked antennae.
 

It has a large blackish-brown head and a bluish green body, with a dark line down its back and a yellow stripe along each side.

Life cycle and foodplants
In northern Europe these  butterflies have a single brood, but in the south they may have up to three broods.

Eggs are laid singly on the underside of foodplant leaves and hatch after about two weeks. They are normally laid on cocksfoot (Dactylis glomerata) but they will occasionally use purple moor-grass (Molinia caerulea), false brome (Brachypodium sylvaticum), tor-grass (B. pinnatum) and wood small-reed (Calamagrostis epigejos). Larvae also feed on various Poaceae, Phalaris arundinacea, Alopecurus pratensis, Calamagrostis purpurea, Deschampsia flexuosa, Phragmites communis and Elymus caninus., but also on Festuca, Triticum, Dactylis glomerata, Molinia, Holcus lanatus, Luzula, etc.

On hatching the larvae construct a shelter in the usual skipper method of curling a leaf up with silk and begins to feed. It hibernates as a half-grown caterpillar and emerges in the spring to continue feeding and growing.

Pupation lasts about three weeks during May and June and the adults are present from June to August. It is the first of the grass skippers to emerge in the UK.  It  is an active butterfly in sunny weather, it is attracted to various flowers but has a distinct liking for bramble flowers.

Gallery

See also 
 List of butterflies of Great Britain
 List of butterflies in Sweden
 List of Lepidoptera of Germany

Citations

References

Jim Asher et al. The Millennium Atlas of Butterflies of Britain and Ireland. Oxford University Press.

External links

UK Butterflies
 Euro Butterflies
Large skipper page from Natural History Collections of the University of Edinburgh
 Paolo Mazzei, Daniel Morel, Raniero Panfili  Moths and Butterflies of Europe and North Africa
 Lepiforum.de
 Butterfly Conservation Armenia

Ochlodes
Butterflies of Europe
Butterflies described in 1777